The isotopic shift (also called isotope shift) is the shift in various forms of spectroscopy that occurs when one nuclear isotope is replaced by another.

NMR spectroscopy
In NMR spectroscopy, Isotopic effects on chemical shifts are typically small, far less than 1 ppm the typical unit for measuring shifts.

Vibrational spectra
Isotopic shifts are best known and most widely used in vibration spectroscopy where the shifts are large, being proportional to the ratio of the square root of the isotopic masses. In the case of hydrogen, the "H-D shift" is (1/2)1/2 or 1/1.41. This shift reflects the differing reduced mass for the affected bonds.

Atomic spectra
Isotope shifts in atomic spectra are minute differences between the electronic energy levels of isotopes of the same element. They are the focus of a multitude of theoretical and experimental efforts due to their importance for atomic and nuclear physics. If atomic spectra also have hyperfine structure the shift refers to the center of gravity of the spectra.

From a nuclear physics perspective, isotope shifts combine different precise atomic physics probes for studying nuclear structure, and their main use is nuclear-model-independent determination of charge-radii differences. 

Two effects contribute to this shift:

Mass effects
The mass difference (mass shift), which dominates the isotope shift of light elements. It is traditionally divided to a normal mass shift (NMS) resulting from the change in the reduced electronic mass, and a specific-mass-shift (SMS) which is present in multi-electron atoms and ions.

The NMS is a purely kinematical effect, studied theoretically by Hughes and Eckart. It can be formulated as follows:

In a theoretical model of atom, which have a infinitely massive nucleus, the energy (in wavenumbers) of a transition can be calculated from Rydberg formula

However, for a nucleus with finite mass , reduced mass is used in the expression of Rydberg constant instead of mass of electron:

The above equations imply that such mass shift is greatest for hydrogen and deuterium since their mass ratio is the largest .

The effect of the specific mass shift was first observed in the spectrum of neon isotopes by Nagaoka and Mishima.

Considering the kinetic energy operator in Schrödinger equation of multi-electron atoms,

For a stationary atom, the conservation of momentum gives

Therefore, the kinetic energy operator becomes

Ignoring the second term, then the rest two terms in equation can be combined and original mass term need to be replaced by the reduced mass , and this gives the normal mass shift formulated above.

The second term in the kinetic term gives an additional isotope shift in spectral lines known as specific mass shift, giving

Using perturbation theory, the first order energy shift can be calculated as 

which requires the knowledge of accurate many-electron wave function.

Volume effects
The volume difference (field shift) dominates the isotope shift of heavy elements. This difference induces a change in the electric charge distribution of the nucleus. The phenomenon was described theoretically by Pauli and Peierls. Adopting a simplified picture, the change in an energy level resulting from the volume difference is proportional to the change in total electron probability density at the origin times the mean-square charge radius difference.

Similarly, calculating the electrostatic potential of an ideal charge density uniformly distributed in a sphere, the nuclear electrostatic potential is

Then the unperturbed Hamiltonian is subtracted, the perturbation is the difference of the potential in the above equation and Coulomb potential .

Such a purterbation of the atomic system neglects all other potential effect like relativistic corrections. Using the perturbation theory (quantum mechanics), the first-order energy shift due to such perturbation is

Since the wave function  has radial and angular parts, and the perturbation has no angular dependence so the spherical harmonic normalize integral over the unit sphere

Since the radius of nuclues  is small, and within such a small region , the following approximation is valid . Integration gives

The explicit form for hydrogenic wave function gives .

In an real experiment, the difference of this energy shift of different isotopes  is measured. These isotopes have nuclear radius difference .

The above equation confirms that the volumn effect is more significant for hydrogenic atoms with larger Z, which explains why volume effects dominates the isotope shift of heavy elements.

See also
Kinetic isotope effect
Magnetic isotope effect

References 

Emission spectroscopy